Michael Whalen (born December 2, 1965) is a composer of over 650 television and film scores and thousands of advertising jingles.  He has won two Emmy Awards and his works are featured in places from TV shows to audiobooks. Projects include the 2011 human trafficking film Cargo and short films for Disney. As a recording artist and producer, his solo piano recording "All the Things I Could Not Say" was released in 2013, and he performs in NYC frequently, where he is an adjunct professor at The City College of New York, and the Clive Davis Institute of Recorded Music at the Tisch School of the Arts at New York University. Whalen is represented and published by Warner/Chappell Music.

Early life 
Michael was born in Long Island, NY, to author, columnist, economist, Presidential adviser and lobbyist Richard J. Whalen and art dealer and author Joan M. Whalen. The family moved to Washington, D.C. when he was two years old.

Whalen started playing the piano at the age of three, and began formal lessons on drums when he was five. Influenced by rock, progressive music, early "ambient" music and fusion, he experimented with many different styles of music into his teens. In the summer of 1980, Whalen found himself playing percussion with the Maryland all-state orchestra, second keyboards in a well known Washington "Go-Go" band, and drums in a garage-style punk band. In the fall of 1980, he went to boarding school for high school at St. Andrew's School in Middletown, Delaware. During high school, Whalen wrote his first music, switched his primary instrument from percussion to keyboards, and made his first studio recordings and first self produced recordings on a cassette 4-track machine. In 1982, he produced and released his first "single" with singer/songwriter and guitarist Jim Steed. 

In May 1987, Whalen attended the Berklee College of Music in Boston (from 1984 - 1985) and the University of Maryland/College Park (1985 - 1987) and moved to New York City.  After recording hundreds of tracks in his 8-track basement studio and throughout the Washington-metro area, Whalen moved to New York City.

Career
Michael's first job was working at Elias Associates (later it was called Elias Arts) as an assistant. Elias was one of the busiest music production companies in the world in the 1980s and 1990s, and Whalen immersed himself in the state-of-the-art technology available in the studios at Elias at night. Their studios featured the Synclavier Digital Audio System which became a huge part of Whalen's later career. It was at Elias that Whalen did his first sound design and composition of national advertisements (Pepsi, Coca-Cola, BMW, Nutrasweet, IBM, Ford and many others). He also had an opportunity to work with recording artists Duran Duran, John Waite and Glamour Camp as assistant, programmer and sound designer. 

Working for many of the top music companies, Whalen did many hundreds of commercials from 1989 to 1995. In 1990, Michael scored his first major television series entitled "Childhood" which was broadcast on PBS in the United States. This was the first of nearly 70 multi-part series he has composed music for and the first of the nearly 600-plus television shows he has worked on. In 1995, Whalen opened his own music production company, Michael Whalen Music, LTD. During these years, Whalen scored dozens of films for National Geographic, Discovery, The History Channel, ESPN, PBS and many others. In 1997, he won his first Emmy award for his work on HBO's "How Do You Spell God?" In 1998, Whalen wrote the theme for ABC News' "Good Morning America".
In 1998, he moved to the suburbs of Boston where he built a new studio in his attic.

2000 to present 
In 2002, Whalen was an associate professor at the Berklee College of Music in Boston. He completed work on the soundtrack for the film Veronika Decides to Die starring Sarah Michelle Gellar in 2008. While living in New York City, he was appointed as an adjunct lecturer at City College of New York in January 2009. Also in 2009, Whalen became an adjunct professor at the Clive Davis Institute of Recorded Music at New York University in June 2009. The piano solo "My Linda," from his album Dancing In Black & White, provided the introductory music for all 12 volumes of Anthony Powell's A Dance to the Music of Time as recorded by Simon Vance for Audible Modern Vanguard.
 
In 2009, Whalen released his first EP featuring him as a vocalist, titled The Road of Ghosts.

In 2017, Whalen produced "Tiny Hands", a protest song written for the Inauguration of Donald Trump and the Women's March on Washington and performed by Fiona Apple.

It was confirmed that Whalen would be a composer for the upcoming Five Nights At Freddy’s Film, produced by Blumhouse.

Selected discography

 Mike Whalen/Jim Steed "Get a Little Closer/Don't Let Go" (Single) [Artist, Producer, Composer] 1984 Patch Records		
 Michael Whalen "Sea Power: A Global Journey" (Soundtrack)[Artist, Producer, Composer] 1993 Narada Cinema	
 Michael Whalen "Phantom of the Forest" (Soundtrack) [Artist, Producer, Composer] 1994 Narada Cinema	
 Michael Whalen "Great African Moments" (Soundtrack) [Artist, Producer, Composer] 1994 Narada Cinema
 VARIOUS "Christmas Blessings" (Holiday Compilation)[Artist, Producer, Arranger] 1995 Narada
 David Arkenstone "Quest of the Dream Warrior" [Producer, Arranger, Conductor] 1995 Narada
 Michael Whalen "Forever Wild" (Soundtrack) [Artist, Producer, Composer] 1996 Narada
 Michael Whalen "Night Scenes" [Artist, Producer, Composer] 1996 Hearts of Space	
 Michael Whalen "Afraid of Thunder" [Artist, Producer, Composer] 1996 Helicon Classical
 Jim Brickman "Picture This" [Producer, Arranger] 1997 Windham Hill
 Open Door "North From Riverside" [Artist, Producer, Composer] 1997 Helicon Jazz	
 VARIOUS "Songs Without Words" (Collection) [Artist, Producer, Composer] 1997 Windham Hill 
 VARIOUS "Grand Piano" (Compilation)[Artist, Producer, Composer] 1998 Narada
 Michael Whalen "Titanic: Anatomy of a Disaster"	[Artist, Producer, Composer] 1998 Centaur Records
 VARIOUS "Poké Mon: 2 B A Master" (Soundtrack) [Composer, Producer] 1999 Koch/4 Kids
 Michael Whalen "The Softest Touch" [Artist, Producer, Composer] 1999 EverSound
 Michael Whalen "The Shadows of October" [Composer, Executive Producer] 1999 Arabesque Classical
 VARIOUS "Tidings of Joy" [Artist, Producer, Composer] 1999 EverSound
 Michael Whalen "The Border of Dusk" [Artist, Producer, Composer] 2000 Koch Jazz
 VARIOUS "Reel Life: the private music of film composers" (Collection) [Executive Producer] 2000 Arabesque Classical
 Jim Steed "Til' I Found You" [Composer, Producer, Arranger] 2000 JSM 
 Michael Whalen "Lost Liners" (Soundtrack) [Artist, Producer, Composer] 2000 MWM/Orchard
 Michael Whalen "Mysterious Ways"[Artist, Producer, Composer] 2001 Koch Jazz
 VARIOUS "Rare Requests: Volume 2" (Compilation) [Artist, Producer, Composer] 2001 Q/Atlantic	
 VARIOUS "20 Years of Narada Piano" (Compilation) [Artist, Producer, Composer] 2001 Narada/EMI	
 VARIOUS "Yu-Gi-Oh: Music to Duel By" (Soundtrack) [Artist, Producer, Composer] 2002 Koch/4 Kids
 Michael Whalen "The Shape of Life" (Soundtrack)[Artist, Producer, Composer] 2002 Alchemy 
 VARIOUS "Earth Songs/Precious Waters" (Artist, Producer, Composer) 2003 Narada
 Michael Whalen "Night Scenes" [re-issue][Artist, Producer, Composer] 2003 Alchemy
 Michael Whalen "From Conception to Birth" (Soundtrack)[Artist, Producer, Composer] 2004 Valley/Cherry Lane
 Michael Whalen "Like Rain Through My Hands" [Artist, Producer, Composer] 2004	MWM/Orchard
 Jon Durant "Things Behind the Sun" [Musician] 2004 Alchemy 
 Michael Whalen "Jazzworks Volume 1" (Collection) [Artist, Producer, Composer] 2004 MWM/Orchard
 Michael Whalen "Slavery and the Making of America" (Soundtrack) [Artist, Producer, Composer] 2005 Valley Entertainment	
 Michael Whalen "My Secret Heart" [Artist, Producer, Composer] 2005 Narada
 Michael Whalen "Music for the Natural World" (Collection) [Artist, Producer, Composer] 2005 MWM	
 Michael Whalen "Lullabies for Grown-ups" (Collection)	[Artist, Producer, Composer] 2005 MWM	
 Jim Steed "Fall" (EP)	[Composer, Producer] 2007 Jim Steed Music
 Michael Whalen "The Other Coast"[Artist, Producer, Composer] 2007 MWM/Spout
 Andiamo "Love, From Italy" (Soundtrack) [Composer, Producer, Arranger] 2007 Denon Classical 
 Michael Whalen "The Road of Ghosts" (EP) [Artist, Producer, Songwriter] 2009 MWM/Spout
 Kristin Hoffman "The Waking" (EP) [Composer, Producer, Arranger] 2009	KHM
 Michael Whalen "Dancing in Black and White:The Best of Michael Whalen" (Compilation) [Artist, Producer, Composer] 2010 EverSound	
 Michael Whalen "Lights Along the Highway" [Composer, Producer, Conductor] 2010 Arabesque Classical
 Supa' K "Fun Fun Fun Fun Fun with Supa' K" "Producer, Co-Composer" 2011 Orchard Children's Music
 Michael Whalen "The Sea of Tranquility" [Artist, Producer, Composer] 2012 MWM/Spout	
 Michael Whalen "All The Things I Wanted To Say" [Artist, Producer, Composer] 2014 MWM/Spout
 Bala Brothers "Bala Brothers" (Soundtrack) "Producer, Arranger" 2015	Parlaphone
 Michael Whalen "You Are My Home" [Artist, Producer, Composer] 2015 MWM/Spout
 Azure "Je Réve" [single] [Artist, Producer, Composer] 2016 
 Michael Whalen "Dream Cycle" [Artist, Producer, Composer] 2017 Valley Entainment
 Michael Whalen "Kiss The Quiet" [Artist, Producer, Composer] 2018 MWM/Spout	
 Michael Whalen "Cupid Blindfolded" [Artist, Producer, Composer] 2019	Solace/Real Music
 Michael Whalen "Sacred Spaces" [Artist, Producer, Composer] 2020 Solace/myndstream
 BlueMonk/Michael Whalen "Karmic Dreams" [Artist, Producer, Co-Composer] 2020 Solace/myndstream
 Michael Whalen "Future Shock" [Artist, Producer, Composer] 2021 Solace/myndstream

References

External links
 Official website
 

1965 births
American film score composers
American male film score composers
American television composers
Jingle composers
Living people
New York University staff